Lhendup Dorji is a Bhutanese international footballer who currently plays for Lonestar Kashmir FC in the I-League 2nd Division.

Career

Club career
Winning hearts of his natives in Paro for being best footballer, he began playing school and club football with Ugyen Academy at the age of 14.

He won 2013 Bhutan National League with Ugyen Academy

The midfielder was also the part of Ugyen Academy FC squad which played in the 2014 AFC President's Cup.

He went on to represent the country as an under-19 national team and faced football giants of Middle Eastern nations like Qatar, Kuwait, and Bahrain.

Lhendup Dorji was among the experienced players Paro FC signed in their debut national league season and finished as runners up, one point behind the champions Transport United in 2018. The runner-up title with Paro FC was his second runner-up title of the premier football competition in the country. He last recorded runners up the title with Thimphu FC

He also played in domestic competitions with Choden FC, Druk Stars, Thimphu FC, Paro United FC, High-Quality  United FC, and Paro FC

Lonestar Kashmir
Following his performances both domestically and in continental football, Lhendup Dorji earned himself a move to Lonestar Kashmir in the Indian I-League 2nd Division 2019.

International career
He made his first appearance for the Bhutan national football team in 2015 in their historic World Cup qualifying match against Sri Lanka. He also played in a number of their second qualifying round matches and in the 2015 SAFF Championship. He also played for U19 championship in Qatar and U23 championship in Guwahati, India.

Career statistics

Honours

Club
Ugyen Academy
 Bhutan National League : 2013

References

Bhutanese footballers
Bhutan international footballers
Living people
Association football forwards
1994 births
Expatriate footballers in India
Bhutanese expatriate sportspeople in India